Hecestoptera is a moth genus in the family Autostichidae. It contains the species Hecestoptera kyra, which is found in Kurdistan.

References

Symmocinae